One Good Turn is a 1955 British comedy film directed by John Paddy Carstairs and starring Norman Wisdom, Joan Rice, Shirley Abicair and Thora Hird. The main setting of the film is an English children's home, located south of London.

Plot
Norman lives at Greenwood children's home, south of London, where he grew up. He has stayed on and serves as carer and general dogsbody. He regards the staff and children there as his family, and when Jimmy, one of the boys, sets his heart on a model car which he has seen in a shop window, Norman is determined to raise the money to buy it. But he cannot afford it on his meagre wages, and Matron refuses to provide the money.

Norman joins the schoolchildren on a train excursion to Brighton, as he has never seen the sea. However, he loses his trousers before boarding. On leaving the train, he is chased by the police and disguises his appearance by joining the final stage of the London to Brighton walking race. Due to his advantage in joining so late, he wins, but fails to sell the silver cup he has been awarded to a pawnbroker, who thinks the trophy has been stolen. Norman acquires a top hat and tails and is eating candy floss by a stage door. The manager comes out searching for the orchestra conductor and mistakes Norman as the missing man (his candy floss stick look like a baton). Norman creates a disjointed performance and starts laughing. The laughter is infectious and soon the whole audience is laughing. After a short section of normality where the orchestra play Lohengrin Norman decides to move to big band music.

At this point the real conductor arrives and Norman tries to hide. As the orchestra play the William Tell Overture Norman runs around and causes chaos.

At a local fair, he sees he can win £10 by lasting three rounds in a boxing fight. He gets hypnotised to make himself a good boxer. This is succeeding but both the boxing and hypnotism are scams so they cheat him out of the money. The audience have seen what happened and have a whip-round for him, which raises fifteen shillings. Norman bursts into song as he stands by a cupie doll game at the fair. He gets enough money to buy the pedal car but a misunderstanding as it leaves the shop window leads to another police pursuit.

Norman returns to the Home, but finds it in a state of siege. The chairman of the trustees is also a crooked property speculator and wants to evict the kids so that a factory can be built on the site. The children defenders are successful and the home is saved. Little Johnny says he no longer wants the car as he has been given a model plane.

Cast
 Norman Wisdom as Norman
 Joan Rice as Iris Gibson
 Shirley Abicair as Mary
 Thora Hird as Cook
 William Russell as Alec Bigley
 Joan Ingram as Matron Sparrow
 Richard Caldicot as Mr. Bigley
 Marjorie Fender as Tuppeny
 Keith Gilman as Jimmy
 Noel Howlett as Jeweller
 David Hurst as Professor Dofee
 Harold Kasket as Igor Petrovitch
 Ricky McCullough as Gunner Mac
 Anthony Green as Martin

Production
Producer Maurice Cowan made Wisdom's first film and wrote the story for his third. He so disliked working with Wisdom on this film that he never produced another film for the comedian.

Reception
The film was the 7th most popular movie at the British box office in 1955. According to Kinematograph Weekly it was a "money maker" at the British box office in 1955.

In a Radio Times review written many decades later, it was asserted: "this is the cleverly constructed follow-up to Norman Wisdom's smash-hit debut Trouble in Store. Arguably the best of his vehicles...Of course, the film is overly sentimental, but sentiment was part of Wisdom's stock-in-trade, and today, if we can look beyond the home-grown schmaltz, we can recognise the rare quality of a true cinematic clown".

References

External links

 One Good Turn at BFI Screenonline

1955 films
Films directed by John Paddy Carstairs
Films with screenplays by Ted Willis, Baron Willis
Films with screenplays by John Paddy Carstairs
Films with screenplays by Sid Colin
1955 comedy films
Films shot at Pinewood Studios
British comedy films
Films set in England
1950s English-language films
1950s British films
British black-and-white films